Médecins de nuit is a French medical drama television series which aired between 22 September 1978 and 27 June 1986. It was originally televised on Antenne 2 station, which on 7 September was renamed France 2, and then rebroadcast later on M6, serieclub (a cable and satellite network in France) and Jimmy,  a satellite digital television channel. Thirty eight 54 minute episodes were produced across 5 seasons.

The theme song was composed by Vladimir Cosma. Philippe Lefebvre directed the first season and as other seasons followed, by was succeeded by Bruno Gantillon, Peter Kassovitz,  and  amongst others.

Synopsis 
This television series features a team of medical doctors who work at night during an emergency. Besides the medical angle, the series highlights the social issues of the Paris suburbs at the end of the 1970s.

Cast

 Catherine Allégret : Léone
 Étienne Chicot : Dr. Christophe Rossin
  : Michel
  : Anne
  : Alpha
  : Jean-François
 Brigitte Roüan : Hélène
  : Patrick
  :season 3 : La pharmacienne
 Marcel Dalio :season 2
 Richard Anconina :season 2
 Hélène Vincent :season 1
 Jean-Pierre Castaldi :season 1
 Anémone :season 2
 Christophe Bourseiller :season 2
 Martine Sarcey :season 2
 Evelyne Bouix :season 2
 Jean-François Stévenin :season 2
 Gérard Lanvin :season 2
 Bernard-Pierre Donnadieu :season 2
 Madeleine Barbulée :season 3
 Éva Darlan :season 3
 Georges Chamarat :season 3
 Richard Bohringer :season 3
 Charles Gérard :season 3
 Jean-Pierre Kalfon :season 3
 Roland Blanche :season 4
 Michel Beaune :season 4
 Maurice Risch :season 4
 Dominique Zardi :season 4
 Paul Le Person :season 5
 Linda de Suza :season 5
 Gisèle Pascal :season 5

Guest
 Albert Delpy
 Dorothée Jemma 
 Édith Scob 
 Françoise Bertin
 Hélène Vincent 
 Katia Tchenko
 Liliane Rovère 
 Magali Clément

Episodes

Season 1 
 Michel. Director: Philippe Lefebvre
 Anne. Director: Philippe Lefebvre
 Alpha. Director: 
 Jean-François. Director: Philippe Lefebvre
 Hélène. Director: Peter Kassovitz
 Christophe. Director: Philippe Lefebvre

Season 2 
 Self-Defence. Director: Bruno Gantillon
 Royal Palace. Director: 
 Henri Gillot, 62, retired. Director: 
 The Red Book. Director: 
 Léone. Director: Bruno Gantillon
 Disco. Director: 
 The Margiis. Director:

Season 3 
 Castel Factory. Director: Peter Kassovitz
 The Convertible. Director: 
 A Cooked Dish. Director: Peter Kassovitz
 Financial Support for Michel. Director: 
 Amalgine. Director: 
 The Warehouse. Director:

Season 4 
 A Spanish night. Director: 
 The Rock Group. Director: 
 Jo Formose. Director: 
 Unpleasant Tricks. Director: 
 The Lie. Director: 
 Quingaoshu. Director: 
 The Last Night. Director:

Season 5 
 Chinese Night. Director: 
 Panic. Director: Franz Josef Gottlieb
 Password. Director: 
 Marie-Charlotte. Director: 
 Happy birthday. Director: 
 Time Out. Director: 
 Hep Taxi!. Director: 
 Disc-Jockey. Director: Franz Josef Gottlieb
 Six brave Little Indians, Director: Franz Josef Gottlieb
 Anguish. Director: Franz Josef Gottlieb
 Wanted. Director: Franz Josef Gottlieb
 The End As Always. Director: Franz Josef Gottlieb

References

External links
 
 A list of films set in Paris in the 1970s

1970s French television series
1980s French television series
1978 French television series debuts
1986 French television series endings
French medical television series
French drama television series